Acrobasis is a genus of moths of the family Pyralidae.

Species

vaccinii species group
Acrobasis amplexella
Acrobasis vaccinii – cranberry fruitworm moth
indigenella species group
Acrobasis indigenella – leaf crumpler moth
tricolorella species group
Acrobasis tricolorella – destructive prune worm, tricolored acrobasis moth 
comptella species group
Acrobasis comptella
minimella species group
Acrobasis blanchardorum
Acrobasis minimella
caryae species group
Acrobasis caryae – hickory shoot borer moth
Acrobasis caulivorella
Acrobasis elyi
Acrobasis evanescentella
Acrobasis juglanivorella
Acrobasis nuxvorella – pecan nut casebearer moth
Acrobasis texana
stigmella species group
Acrobasis angusella – hickory leafstem borer moth
Acrobasis aurorella
Acrobasis demotella – walnut shoot moth
Acrobasis exsulella – cordovan pyralid moth
Acrobasis latifasciella
Acrobasis stigmella
palliolella species group
Acrobasis caryalbella
Acrobasis juglandis – pecan leaf casebearer moth
Acrobasis kearfottella – Kearfott's acrobasis moth
Acrobasis palliolella – mantled acrobasis moth
caryivorella species group
Acrobasis caryivorella
cunulae species group
Acrobasis betulella – birch tubemaker moth
Acrobasis betulivorella
Acrobasis carpinivorella
Acrobasis cirroferella
Acrobasis comptoniella – sweetfern leaf casebearer moth
Acrobasis coryliella
Acrobasis cunulae
Acrobasis irrubriella
Acrobasis kylesi
Acrobasis normella
Acrobasis ostryella
Acrobasis rubrifasciella – alder tubemaker moth
Acrobasis sylviella – ironwood tubemaker moth

Unknown species group

Acrobasis advenella (Zincken, 1818)
Acrobasis africanella  Balinsky, 1994
Acrobasis aicha  Asselbergs, 1998
Acrobasis alexandra  Roesler & Küppers, 1981
Acrobasis aqualidella  Christoph, 1881
Acrobasis atelogramma (Meyrick, 1937)
Acrobasis atrisquamella
Acrobasis automorpha (Meyrick, 1886)
Acrobasis baharaca (Roesler, 1987)
Acrobasis bifidella (Leech, 1889)
Acrobasis birgitella (Roesler, 1975)
Acrobasis bithynella
Acrobasis bouchirella (Amsel, 1951)
Acrobasis caliginella (Hulst, 1878)
Acrobasis canella  Yamanaka, 2003
Acrobasis cantonella (Caradja, 1925)
Acrobasis caribbeana  J. C. Shaffer, 1978
Acrobasis celticola  Staudinger, 1879
Acrobasis celtifoliella  Yamanaka, 2004
Acrobasis centunculella
Acrobasis consociella
Acrobasis corethropus (Turner, 1904)
Acrobasis craterantis (Meyrick, 1933)
Acrobasis curvella (Ragonot, 1893)
Acrobasis cymindella (Ragonot, 1893)
Acrobasis dharma  Roesler & Küppers, 1981
Acrobasis diversicolor  Ragonot, 1893
Acrobasis dulcella (Zeller, 1848)
Acrobasis eburnella (Amsel, 1954)
Acrobasis encaustella  Ragonot, 1893
Acrobasis epaxia
Acrobasis erastriella (Ragonot, 1887)
Acrobasis ereboscopa
Acrobasis eva  Roesler & Küppers, 1981
Acrobasis fallouella (Ragonot, 1871)
Acrobasis farsella (Amsel, 1950)
Acrobasis ferruginella  Wileman, 1911
Acrobasis flavifasciella  Yamanaka, 1990
Acrobasis foroiuliensis  Huemer & Nuss, 2007
Acrobasis frankella (Roesler, 1975)
Acrobasis fuscatella  Yamanaka, 2004
Acrobasis getuliella (Zerny, 1914)
Acrobasis glaucella
Acrobasis hemiargyralis (Hampson, 1908)
Acrobasis hemichlaena (Meyrick, 1887)
Acrobasis hollandella (Ragonot, 1893)
Acrobasis homoeosomidia  Hampson, 1901
Acrobasis injunctella (Christoph, 1881)
Acrobasis izuensis  Yamanaka, 2004
Acrobasis khachella (Amsel, 1950)
Acrobasis klimeschi  Roesler, 1978
Acrobasis legatea (Haworth, 1811)
Acrobasis lienpingialis (Caradja, 1925)
Acrobasis lutulentella  Yamanaka, 2003
Acrobasis malifoliella  Yamanaka, 2003
Acrobasis marmorea (Haworth, 1811)
Acrobasis mienshani  Caradja, 1939
Acrobasis minorella (Caradja, 1910)
Acrobasis minutalis Asselbergs, 2008
Acrobasis mirabiella (Toll, 1948)
Acrobasis mniaropis
Acrobasis modisequa  Meyrick, 1934
Acrobasis nigribasalis  Amsel, 1954
Acrobasis nipponella (Yamanaka, 2000)
Acrobasis niveicinctella (Ragonot, 1887)
Acrobasis obliqua
Acrobasis obrutella (Christoph, 1881)
Acrobasis obtusella
Acrobasis ochrifasciella Yamanaka, 2006 or Acrobasis ochrofasciella
Acrobasis olivalis
Acrobasis ottomana  Caradja, 1916
Acrobasis pallicornella (Ragonot, 1887)
Acrobasis persicella (Amsel, 1951)
Acrobasis pirivorella
Acrobasis porphyrella
Acrobasis praefectella (Zerny, 1936)
Acrobasis ptilophanes  Meyrick, 1929
Acrobasis quarcella (Roesler, 1987)
Acrobasis ramosella  Walker, 1866
Acrobasis regina  Roesler & Küppers, 1981
Acrobasis repandana (Fabricius, 1798)
Acrobasis romanella
Acrobasis rufilimbalis (Wileman, 1911)
Acrobasis rufizonella
Acrobasis sasakii  Yamanaka, 2003
Acrobasis sirani (Roesler & Küppers, 1981)
Acrobasis sodalella
Acrobasis squalidella  Christoph, 1881
Acrobasis suavella (Zincken, 1818)
Acrobasis subceltifoliella  Yamanaka, 2006
Acrobasis subflavella (Inoue, 1982)
Acrobasis susanna  Roesler & Küppers, 1981
Acrobasis tricolorella (Inoue, 1982) (described as Conobathra tricolorella. Preocc. Acrobasis tricolorella. Replacement name unknown) – destructive pruneworm moth
Acrobasis tumidana
Acrobasis vicinella (Yamanaka, 2000)
Acrobasis vinaceellum (Ragonot, 1901)
Acrobasis xanthogramma (Staudinger, 1870)
Acrobasis yakushimensis (Yamanaka, 2000)
Acrobasis zacharias  Roesler, 1988
Acrobasis zamantha (Roesler, 1987)
Acrobasis zyziphella  Rebel, 1914

References

External links
 

 
Phycitini
Pyralidae genera
Taxa named by Philipp Christoph Zeller